Siôn Tudur (also John Tudur, c. 1522–1602) was a 16th century Welsh language poet.

After serving as a yeoman in the courts of Edward VI and Mary, Siôn returned to Wales where he was tutored by Gruffudd Hiraethog. Siôn’s surviving work consists of poems in praise of nobility, poetic rendering of psalms, and his concerns on contemporary Welsh society.

References
E. Roberts, Gwaith Siôn Tudur, University of Wales Press, 1981
D.J. Bowen, Gwaith Gruffudd Hiraethog, University of Wales Press, 1990

1522 births
1602 deaths
Welsh-language poets
16th-century Welsh poets
Year of birth uncertain